The 1979 Speedway World Team Cup was the 20th edition of the FIM Speedway World Team Cup to determine the team world champions.

The final took place on 16 September at the White City Stadium in London. New Zealand won their first title defeating defending champions Denmark, who finished in second place.

Qualification

Round A
 May 20
  Reading, Smallmead Stadium
 Referee:  C.Bergstrom

* New Zealand and USA to Intercontinental Final

Round B
 May 20
  Tampere, Ratinan stadion

* Denmark and Sweden to Intercontinental Final

Round C
 May 20
  Kempten

* Austria and Netherlands to Continental Semifinal

Round D
 May 20
  Miskolc

* Soviet Union and Hungary to Continental Semifinal

Tournament

Continental Semifinal
 July 15
  Pardubice, Svítkova Stadion

* Soviet Union and Hungary to Continental Final

Continental Final
 July 29
  Wrocław, Olympic Stadium
 Att: 35,000

* Poland and Czechoslovakia to Final

Intercontinental Final
 June 14
  Eskilstuna
 Att: 4,400

* New Zealand and Denmark to Final

World Final
 September 16
  London, White City Stadium
 Referee:  Gunther Sorber

See also
 1979 Individual Speedway World Championship
 1979 Speedway World Pairs Championship

References

1979
World T